The list of shipwrecks in 1764 includes some ships sunk, wrecked or otherwise lost during 1764.

January

4 January

10 January

11 January

13 January

15 January

30 January

Unknown date

February

3 February

Unknown date

March

1 March

2 March

6 March

18 March

20 March

21 March

23 March

27 March

30 March

Unknown date

April

3 April

9 April

10 April

20 April

21 April

28 April

Unknown date

May

5 May

13 May

Unknown date

June

19 June

Unknown date

July

4 July

Unknown date

August

1 August

4 August

15 August

Unknown date

September

5 September

26 September

Unknown date

October

5 October

10 October

17 October

25 October

28 October

29 October

November

1 November

7 November

9 November

12 November

13 November

15 November

18 November

21 November

Unknown date

December

5 December

14 December

19 December

Unknown date

Unknown date

References

1764